Auriscalpium umbella is a species of fungus in the family Auriscalpiaceae of the Russulales order. Described by the Dutch mycologist Rudolph Arnold Maas Geesteranus in 1971, it is known from New Zealand.

References

External links

Fungi described in 1971
Fungi of New Zealand
Russulales